Vencelas Dabaya Tientcheu (born 28 April 1981 in Kumba, Cameroon) is a French weightlifter. He is a former World Champion, European champion and Olympic silver medalist in weightlifting.

At the 2004 Summer Olympics he represented Cameroon, and was flag bearer of the Cameroonian team at the opening ceremony. In the Olympic tournament he ranked 5th in the 69 kg category, with a total of 327.5 kg. He represents France since he became naturalized French citizen in November 2004.

He won the bronze medal in the 69 kg category at the 2005 World Weightlifting Championships.

Dabaya participated in the men's -69 kg class at the 2006 World Weightlifting Championships and won the gold medal, snatching 146 kg and jerking an additional 186 kg for a total of 332 kg. With his gold medal, became weightlifting's 500th World Champion and received the special IWF Award for this honour.

At the 2007 World Weightlifting Championships he ranked 4th in the 69 kg category.

He won the silver medal in the 69 kg category at the 2008 European Weightlifting Championships, lifting a total of 333 kg.

At the 2008 Summer Olympics he won the silver medal in the 69 kg category, lifting a total of 338 kg.

He won gold in the clean and jerk, bronze in the snatch, and overall silver with a total of 333 kg at the 2009 European Weightlifting Championships in the 69 kg category.

Major Results

References

External links
 Athlete Biography at beijing2008

Living people
1981 births
Cameroonian male weightlifters
French male weightlifters
Cameroonian emigrants to France
Olympic weightlifters of Cameroon
Olympic weightlifters of France
Weightlifters at the 2004 Summer Olympics
Weightlifters at the 2008 Summer Olympics
Weightlifters at the 2012 Summer Olympics
Weightlifters at the 2002 Commonwealth Games
Olympic silver medalists for France
Naturalized citizens of France
People from Southwest Region (Cameroon)
Olympic medalists in weightlifting
Medalists at the 2008 Summer Olympics
Knights of the Ordre national du Mérite
Commonwealth Games gold medallists for Cameroon
Commonwealth Games medallists in weightlifting
African Games bronze medalists for Cameroon
African Games medalists in weightlifting
Mediterranean Games gold medalists for France
Mediterranean Games medalists in weightlifting
Competitors at the 1999 All-Africa Games
Competitors at the 2009 Mediterranean Games
European Weightlifting Championships medalists
World Weightlifting Championships medalists
Medallists at the 2002 Commonwealth Games